Martin Pohl (born 13 April 1981) is a German former footballer who played as a defender.

References

External links
 

1981 births
Living people
Sportspeople from Rostock
German footballers
Association football defenders
FC Hansa Rostock players
FC Rot-Weiß Erfurt players
2. Bundesliga players
3. Liga players
Regionalliga players
Footballers from Mecklenburg-Western Pomerania